Reza Alichi (also Romanized as Reẕā ‘Alīchī) is a village in Band-e Zarak Rural District, in the Central District of Minab County, Hormozgan Province, Iran. At the 2006 census, its population was 306, in 69 families.

References 

Populated places in Minab County